Cian O'Callaghan (born 7 May 1979) is an Irish Social Democrats politician who has been a Teachta Dála (TD) for the Dublin Bay North constituency since the 2020 general election. In 2012, as a member of Fingal County Council, he became Ireland's first openly gay mayor.

He was a member of Fingal County Council from 2009 to 2020.

Early life
O'Callaghan is from Sutton, Dublin. He graduated with a MA from University College Dublin (UCD). During his time at UCD, O'Callaghan was active in student politics, becoming an officer in the Student's Union.

O'Callaghan served as chair of the youth wing of Democratic Left, and served as co-chair of Labour Youth following the merger of Democratic Left with Labour.

Political career

Labour

O'Callaghan was elected to Fingal County Council on his first attempt in 2009, representing Labour, taking the second seat in the Howth-Malahide local electoral area. Following the results of the 2011 Irish general election, O'Callaghan fiercely opposed Labour entering into a coalition government with Fine Gael.

In June 2012, he was elected as Mayor of Fingal, becoming the first openly gay mayor in the country's history. During his time as mayor he highlighted the problems faced by homeowners in a number of newer developments in the Fingal area, where building materials contaminated with pyrite caused severe damage. It was also during this period that O'Callaghan clashed with Labour leader Eamon Gilmore over a number of issues; O'Callaghan criticised Gilmore for placing Labour in a coalition with Fine Gael, for his stance on Irish neutrality and for his stance on the use of Shannon Airport by US military flights.

During his time in Labour, O'Callaghan was considered to have been the political protege of Labour TD Tommy Broughan. Both Broughan and O'Callaghan were considered to be on the left-wing of the Labour Party in that period.

In July 2013, O'Callaghan left the Labour Party, stating the impetus was "the introduction of two budgets in a row that actually increased income inequality by targeting people on low and middle incomes was deeply unjust".

Running as an Independent candidate at the 2014 local elections, O'Callaghan topped the poll in the Howth-Malahide local electoral area.

Social Democrats
O'Callaghan was a founding member of the Social Democrats when they launched the party in July 2015. O'Callaghan stated his reason for joining the party was "because the party has a serious plan for the long term that will give people security in the areas of health, housing and employment.

O'Callaghan contested the 2016 general election for the Social Democrats in Dublin Bay North and received 3,864 first preference votes, being eliminated on the 12th count.

He was the Social Democrats candidate for the Dublin Bay North constituency at the 2020 general election, receiving 6,229 first preference votes, and was elected, taking the third of five seats. In doing so, O'Callaghan took up the seat of his former mentor Tommy Broughan, who had decided not to contest that year's election. Joan Hopkin was co-opted to O'Callaghan's seat on Fingal County Council following his election to the Dáil.

Following the election, O'Callaghan was named as the Social Democrats' spokesperson on Housing, International Affairs and Defence.

As of 2020, O'Callaghan opposes any potential merger of the Social Democrats with the Labour Party. However, O'Callaghan believes that the left-wing parties in Irish politics should work broadly together.

In June 2021 O'Callaghan accused the government of allowing "wild west" standards to develop in the building trade and urged them to correct course following the revelations that thousands of homes across the west coast of Ireland and in Dublin were crumbling because of the use of poor building materials such as Mica and Pyrite. O'Callaghan stated "We are going to be in a situation again, with the taxpayer picking up the bill, if the Government doesn't act in terms of building standards and construction material standards. In particular, we need to have very strong standards put in place, very strong regulation and very strong independent inspections. The Government is operating this kind of wild west on building standards and materials."

In March 2022 O'Callaghan introduced a bill that would make it explicitly illegal for landlords to demand sex as a form of rent or to make any sort of advertising suggesting that sex would be accepted as a form of rent. The government said they would not oppose the measure.

References

External links
Social Democrats profile

1979 births
Living people
Alumni of University College Dublin
Gay politicians
Labour Party (Ireland) politicians
LGBT mayors
LGBT legislators in Ireland
Mayors of places in the Republic of Ireland
People educated at Belvedere College
People from Malahide
Politicians from Fingal
Social Democrats (Ireland) TDs
Members of the 33rd Dáil
21st-century LGBT people